Newtonhill railway station served the town of Newtonhill in Aberdeenshire, Scotland, United Kingdom from its opening in 1851 to its closure in 1956. Newtonhill signal box continued to operate until 2019.

There have been several calls for this station to reopen in recent years. In May 2020, Transport Scotland awarded the local transport body £80,000 to fund a feasibility study into the reopening of Newtonhill railway station. As of April 2021, the report has not yet been published.

References

Disused railway stations in Aberdeenshire
Railway stations in Great Britain opened in 1851
Railway stations in Great Britain closed in 1956
Former Caledonian Railway stations